Boron (formerly Amargo, Baker, Borate, and Kern) is a census-designated place (CDP) in Kern County, California, United States. The population was 2,086 at the 2020 census, up from 2,025 at the 2000 census. Boron is named after the element boron and is the site of the world's largest source of the boron compound boric acid.

Boron is a hinterland community on the western edge of the Mojave Desert. Within a half day's drive one can view the highest and lowest points in the contiguous 48 states of the United States (Mount Whitney and Death Valley), the world's oldest tree, the bristlecone pine, and the cities of Los Angeles and Las Vegas.

Boron is home to the U.S. Borax Boron Mine, California's largest open-pit mine, which is also the largest borax mine in the world.

Geography

Boron is on the border of Kern and San Bernardino Counties along State Route 58. The coordinates are: .

Demographics

2010 census
The 2010 United States Census reported that Boron had a population of 2,253. The racial makeup of Boron was 1,746 (77.5 percent) White, 162 (7.2 percent) African American, 49 (2.2 percent) Native American, 47 (2.1 percent) Asian, 4 (0.2 percent) Pacific Islander, 141 (6.3 percent) from other races, and 104 (4.6 percent) from two or more races. Hispanic or Latino of any race were 406 persons (18.0 percent).

The census reported that 2,253 people (100 percent of the population) lived in households, zero percent lived in non-institutionalized group quarters, and none were institutionalized.

There were 892 households, out of which 295 (33.1 percent) had children under the age of 18 living in them, 364 (40.8 percent) were opposite-sex married couples living together, 126 (14.1 percent) had a female householder with no husband present, 61 (6.8 percent) had a male householder with no wife present. There were 67 (7.5 percent) unmarried opposite-sex partnerships, and three (0.3 percent) same-sex married couples or partnerships. 294 households (33 percent) were made up of individuals, and 112 (12.6 percent) had someone living alone who was 65 years of age or older. The average household size was 2.53. There were 551 families (61.8 percent of all households); the average family size was 3.21.

The population was spread out, with 621 people (27.6 percent) under the age of 18, 173 people (7.7 percent) aged 18 to 24, 472 people (20.9 percent) aged 25 to 44, 691 people (30.7 percent) aged 45 to 64, and 296 people (13.1 percent) who were 65 years of age or older.  The median age was 39.3 years. For every 100 females, there were 106.9 males. For every 100 females age 18 and over, there were 107.1 males.

The homeowner vacancy rate was 3.2 percent; the rental vacancy rate was 31.4 percent.  1,246 people (55.3 percent of the population) lived in owner-occupied housing units and 1,007 people (44.7 percent) lived in rental housing units.

2000 census
As of the census of 2000, there were 2,025 people, 801 households, and 535 families residing in the CDP. The racial makeup of the CDP was 85.04 percent White, 2.22 percent Black or African American, 2.86 percent Native American, 1.58 percent Asian, 0.10 percent Pacific Islander, 4.74 percent from other races, and 3.46 percent two or more races. Nine percent of the population were Hispanic or Latino of any race.

There were 801 households, out of which 31.2 percent had children under the age of 18 living with them, 51.7 percent were married couples living together, 10.2 percent had a female householder with no husband present, and 33.1 percent were non-families. 29.1 percent of all households were made up of individuals, and 9.9 percent had someone living alone who was 65 years of age or older. The average household size was 2.53 and the average family size was 3.11.

In the CDP, the age distribution of the population shows 28 percent under the age of 18, 6.7 percent 18 to 24, 25.2 percent from 25 to 44, 26.9 percent from 45 to 64, and 13.2 percent who were 65 years of age or older. The median age was 39 years. For every 100 females, there were 100.1 males. For every 100 females age 18 and over, there were 101.0 males.

The median income for a household in the CDP was $40,625, and the median income for a family was $44,674. Males had a median income of $47,045 versus $23,854 for females. The per capita income for the CDP was $18,294. About 15.2 percent of families and 19.7 percent of the population were below the poverty line, including 32.8 percent of those under age 18 and 19.4 percent of those age 65 or over.

History 

Borate evaporites in the form of colemanite was first reported in 1913 during drilling of a water well. Claims were acquired by the Pacific Coast Borax Company and exploration continued. In 1925 commercial colemanite production began. In the 1920s and 30s borates were produced from the Baker and West Baker mines.

The first post office at Boron opened in 1938.

Industry 

A large borax deposit was discovered in 1925, and the mining town of Boron was established soon thereafter. This borax deposit is now the world's largest borax mine. It is owned by Rio Tinto Minerals (formerly U.S. Borax). It is operated as an open-pit mine, the largest open-pit mine in California. This mine supplies nearly half of the world's supply of refined borates. Rio Tinto Minerals is Boron's primary employer, employing over 800 people.

 east of Boron, across the county line in San Bernardino County, is the world's largest solar power production facility. The Kramer Junction Company (KJC) is the managing general partner of the five 30 megawatt Solar Energy Generating Systems (SEGS)  facilities in the Mojave Desert at Kramer Junction, California. Together with its wholly owned subsidiary, KJC Operating Company, KJC operates and manages these facilities (SEGS III-VII). These units generate enough electricity to provide the electrical needs of 30,000 to 40,000 homes without the use of fossil fuels during the day.

Attractions

 Saxon Aerospace Museum, honors aviation history related to nearby Edwards Air Force Base and its Air Force Test Center, the Air Force Research Laboratory and NASA Dryden
 Borax Visitor Center at Rio Tinto Borax Mine, provides information about borax, how it is mined, and how it is used
 Twenty Mule Team Museum, adjacent to the Saxon Aerospace Museum, explains the Twenty-mule teams that originally hauled borax

Public services

Law enforcement 
Law enforcement services are provided by the Kern County Sheriff's Department. From 1933 to 1954, personnel from the Mojave substation met the law enforcement need of the Boron area. The first actual office space occupied by the sheriff's office in Boron was a quonset hut shared with the fire department in the 12200 block of Boron Avenue. This continued until 1963 when the sheriff's office established the substation building at 26949 Cote Street. This building housed a small jail and the court in Boron, which operated one day a week.

A federal prison was closed in 2000.

Fire services 
In 1969 the new Boron station 17 opened at 26965 Cote Street. This fire station is operated by the Kern County Fire Department.

Schools 
Boron schools are part of the Muroc Joint Unified School District. The local Boron schools include the K – 6 grade  West Boron Elementary School, and the 7 – 12th grade Boron High School. Boron High School's mascot is the Bobcat. Boron's first school, Gephart School was built in 1929. It burned to the ground in 1994.

Churches 
Boron's original church building was completed for the First Baptist Church in 1940. Boron currently has eight churches. They are the Assembly of God Church, the Boron Bible Church, the Church of Christ, the Church of Jesus Christ of Latter-day Saints, the First Baptist Church of Boron, the Jesus Name Tabernacle United Pentecostal Church, St. Joseph's Catholic Church and Christians in Faith Church.

Notable residents 
Boron was the home of "Walking George" Swain, whose penchant for walking made him a legend. George earned his name as "Walking George" because he never owned a car, or house, and walked to and from work—from his home, which was always rumored to be just a hole in the desert. He supposedly kept himself warm at night with a covering of newspapers. His wardrobe was always the same: wrinkled shirt and pants with well-worn boots. Swain was a chemist at the borax plant in Boron. He attended local events and often played the piano for entertainment. He taught piano to children in Boron and played at the Baptist Church. On his 59th birthday in 1978 an article about George appeared in the Los Angeles Times. By May 1979 he was featured on the TV show Real People. He died on April 25, 2000.
 Boron was home to Pancho Barnes from 1966 to 1975. Barnes was a world-renowned air race and stunt pilot during the 1920s and 1930s. She is better known, however, for being the matron of the Happy Bottom Riding Club. She was forced to move when, during a heated dispute with Edwards Air Force Base over the expansion of one of the nearby base's runways, the club mysteriously burned down. Years later Barnes moved to Boron from Gypsy Springs when her age no longer allowed her to properly tend to her ranch. She died in Boron during the spring of 1975.

Media 
The movie Erin Brockovich (2000), starring Julia Roberts, and various other movies have been filmed in the town, often using local residents as extras.
Movies/shows using locations in and around Boron
 Locked Out (2010)
 Erin Brockovich (2000)
 Gentleman Don La Mancha (2004)
 Gridiron Gang (1993) (TV)
 Neon Signs (1996)
 Spotlight on Location: Erin Brockovich (2000) (TV)
 ...aka Making of 'Erin Brockovich', The (2000) (TV)
Death Valley Days (1952–1975)
 The Carpetbaggers'' (1964)

References

External links
 Muroc Joint Unified School District
 Boron High School
 Twenty Mule Team Museum
 Colonel Vernon P. Saxon Jr. Aerospace Museum
 Borax Visitors Center

Populated places in the Mojave Desert
Mining communities in California
Census-designated places in Kern County, California
Populated places established in 1913
Census-designated places in California
1913 establishments in California